Sri Paku Alam VIII (10 April 1910 – 11 September 1998) was Duke (Adipati) of Pakualaman serving the second Governor of Yogyakarta. He was the son of Paku Alam VII and Gusti Bendara Raden Ayu Retno Poewoso. His child name was Gusti Raden Mas Harya Sularso Kunto Suratno and his adult name was Kanjeng Gusti Pangeran Adipati Arya Prabu.

He acceded to the throne of the Duchy of Pakualaman (Kadipaten Pakualaman) on 12 April 1937 with the official name Kanjeng Gusti Pangeran Adipati Arya Paku Alam VIII. The Pakualaman dates from 1812 and is an enclave within the Yogyakarta Sultanate.

He died in office in 1998, and was buried in the family graveyard at Girigondo.

Paku Alam VIII was a major figure in the independence struggle. His contribution, together with that of Hamengkubuwono IX, led to Yogyakarta gaining status as a Special Region where the Sultan and the Duke serve respectively as governor and vice-governor for life.

Notes

References

1910 births
1998 deaths
Governors of Yogyakarta
Dukes of Pakualaman
Burials at Girigondo
Indonesian royalty